Concordia Teachers College is the former name of two universities in the United States:

Concordia University Nebraska in Seward, Nebraska
Concordia University Chicago in River Forest, Illinois